Charles Saunders (1861–?) was an English real tennis player.

Saunders was the world champion of the sport from 1890, when Tom Pettitt retired, and remained so until 1895.

See also
 List of real tennis world champions

References

1861 births
Year of death missing
19th-century English people
English real tennis players
Place of birth missing